Reşadiye is a village in the Çivril District of Denizli Province in Turkey.

References

Villages in Çivril District